Francis John Harris (May 1902 – 23 August 1997) was a Canadian middle-distance runner. He competed in the men's 800 metres at the 1924 Summer Olympics.

References

External links
 

1902 births
1997 deaths
Athletes (track and field) at the 1924 Summer Olympics
Canadian male middle-distance runners
Olympic track and field athletes of Canada
Place of birth missing
20th-century Canadian people